Reinhard Tristan Eugen Heydrich (7 March 1904 – 4 June 1942) was a high-ranking German SS and police official during the Nazi era and a principal architect of the Holocaust.

Heydrich was chief of the Reich Security Main Office (including the Gestapo, Kripo, and SD). He was also Stellvertretender Reichsprotektor (Deputy/Acting Reich-Protector) of Bohemia and Moravia. He served as president of the International Criminal Police Commission (ICPC, now known as Interpol) and chaired the January 1942 Wannsee Conference which formalised plans for the "Final Solution to the Jewish question"—the deportation and genocide of all Jews in German-occupied Europe.

Many historians regard Heydrich as the darkest figure within the Nazi regime; Adolf Hitler described him as "the man with the iron heart". He was the founding head of the Sicherheitsdienst (Security Service, SD), an intelligence organisation charged with seeking out and neutralising resistance to the Nazi Party via arrests, deportations, and murders. He helped organise Kristallnacht, a series of coordinated attacks against Jews throughout Nazi Germany and parts of Austria on 9–10 November 1938. The attacks were carried out by SA stormtroopers and civilians and presaged the Holocaust. Upon his arrival in Prague, Heydrich sought to eliminate opposition to the Nazi occupation by suppressing Czech culture and deporting and executing members of the Czech resistance. He was directly responsible for the Einsatzgruppen, the special task forces that travelled in the wake of the German armies and murdered more than two million people by mass shooting and gassing, including 1.3 million Jews.

Heydrich was mortally wounded in Prague on 27 May 1942 as a result of Operation Anthropoid. He was ambushed by a team of Czech and Slovak soldiers who had been sent by the Czechoslovak government-in-exile to kill the Reich-Protector; the team was trained by the British Special Operations Executive. Heydrich died from his injuries a week later. Nazi intelligence falsely linked the Czech and Slovak soldiers and resistance partisans to the villages of Lidice and Ležáky. Both villages were razed; the men and boys age 14 and above were shot and most of the women and children were deported and murdered in Nazi concentration camps.

Early life
Reinhard Tristan Eugen Heydrich was born in 1904 in Halle an der Saale to composer and opera singer Richard Bruno Heydrich and his wife, Elisabeth Anna Maria Amalia Heydrich (née Krantz). His father came from a Protestant family, but converted to Elisabeth's Roman Catholic faith upon marriage. Reinhard was an altar boy, attending evening prayers and Mass every week with his mother as part of the Catholic minority in Halle. Two of his forenames were musical references: "Reinhard" referred to the hero from his father's opera Amen, and "Tristan" stems from Richard Wagner's Tristan und Isolde. Heydrich's third name, "Eugen", was his late maternal grandfather's forename (Eugen Krantz had been the director of the Dresden Royal Conservatory).

Heydrich's family held social standing and substantial financial means. Music was a part of Heydrich's everyday life; his father founded the Halle Conservatory of Music, Theatre, and Teaching and his mother taught piano there. As the oldest son, Reinhard was expected to inherit his father's music conservatory and was trained in music by his father. He learned the piano and violin by the time he was six years old. Heydrich developed a passion for the violin and carried that interest into adulthood; he impressed listeners with his musical talent.

His father was a German nationalist with loyalties to the Kaiser, who instilled patriotic ideas in his three children but was not affiliated with any political party until after World War I. The household was strict. Heydrich, initially a frail and sickly youth, was encouraged by his parents to exercise to build up his strength. He engaged his younger brother, Heinz, in mock fencing duels. He excelled in his schoolwork at the secular "Reformgymnasium", especially in the sciences. A talented athlete, he became an expert swimmer and fencer. He was shy, insecure, and was frequently bullied for his high-pitched voice and rumoured Jewish ancestry. These rumours increased after his maternal uncle Hans Krantz married a Hungarian Jew named Iza Jarmy. However, the family maintained cordial relations with the Jewish community; many Jewish students attended the Halle Conservatory, and its cellar was rented out to a Jewish salesman. Heydrich was friends with Abraham Lichtenstein, son of the cantor.

In 1918, World War I ended with Germany's defeat. In late February 1919, civil unrest—including strikes and clashes between communist and anti-communist groups—took place in Heydrich's home town of Halle. Under Defense Minister Gustav Noske's directives, a right-wing paramilitary unit was formed and ordered to "recapture" Halle.  Heydrich, then 15 years old, joined Maercker's Volunteer Rifles (a paramilitary Freikorps unit). This was largely symbolic, as Heydrich was too young for military service. There is no evidence that he participated in the fighting, and when the skirmishes ended, he was part of the force assigned to protect private property. Heydrich began to form positive opinions about the Völkisch movement and anti-communism, as well as a distaste for the Treaty of Versailles and the positioning of the German-Polish border. Heydrich stated he joined the Deutschvölkischer Schutz- und Trutzbund (National German Protection and Shelter League), an antisemitic organisation. However, there is very little documentation of this, beyond a single postcard he received.

As a result of the conditions of the Treaty of Versailles as well as Germany's large war debt, hyperinflation spread across Germany and many lost their life savings. Halle was not spared. By 1921, few townspeople there could afford a musical education at Bruno Heydrich's conservatory. This led to a financial crisis for the Heydrich family.

Naval career

In 1922, Heydrich joined the German Navy (Reichsmarine), taking advantage of the security, structure, and pension it offered. He became a naval cadet at Kiel, Germany's primary naval base. Many of Heydrich's fellow cadets falsely regarded him as Jewish. To counteract these rumors, Heydrich told people he had joined several antisemitic and nationalist organizations, such as the Deutschvölkischer Schutz und Trutzbund. On 1 April 1924 he was promoted to senior midshipman (Oberfähnrich zur See) and sent to officer training at the Naval Academy Mürwik. In 1926 he advanced to the rank of ensign (Leutnant zur See) and was assigned as a signals officer on the battleship SMS Schleswig-Holstein, the flagship of Germany's North Sea Fleet. With the promotion came greater recognition. He received good evaluations from his superiors and had few problems with other crewmen. He was promoted on 1 July 1928 to the rank of first lieutenant.

Heydrich became notorious for his countless affairs. In December 1930 he attended a rowing-club ball and met Lina von Osten. They became romantically involved and soon announced their engagement. Lina was already a Nazi Party follower and antisemite; she had attended her first rally in 1929. Early in 1931 Heydrich was charged with "conduct unbecoming an officer and a gentleman" for a breach of promise, having been engaged to marry another woman he had known for six months before the Lina von Osten engagement. Admiral Erich Raeder dismissed Heydrich from the navy in April. He received severance pay of 200 Reichsmarks a month for the next two years. Heydrich married Lina in December 1931.

Career in the SS
On 30 May 1931, Heydrich's discharge from the navy became legally binding, and either the following day or on 1 June he joined the Nazi Party in Hamburg. Six weeks later, on 14 July, he joined the SS. His party number was 544,916 and his SS number was 10,120. Those who joined the party after Hitler's seizure of power in January 1933 faced suspicions from the Alte Kämpfer (Old Fighters; the earliest party members) that they had joined for reasons of career advancement rather than a true commitment to Nazi ideology. Heydrich's date of enlistment in 1931 was early enough to quell suspicion that he had joined only to further his career, but was not early enough for him to be considered an Old Fighter.

In 1931, Heinrich Himmler began setting up a counterintelligence division of the SS. Acting on the advice of his associate Karl von Eberstein, who was Lina's friend and Heydrich's godbrother, Himmler agreed to interview Heydrich, but cancelled their appointment at the last minute. Lina ignored this message, packed Heydrich's suitcase, and sent him to Munich. Eberstein met Heydrich at the railway station and took him to see Himmler. Himmler asked Heydrich to convey his ideas for developing an SS intelligence service. Himmler was so impressed that he hired Heydrich immediately.

Although the starting monthly salary of 180 Reichsmarks (the equivalent of US$40) was low, Heydrich decided to take the job because Lina's family supported the Nazi movement, and the quasi-military and revolutionary nature of the post appealed to him. At first he had to share an office and typewriter with a colleague, but by 1932 Heydrich was earning 290 Reichsmarks a month, a salary he described as "comfortable". As his power and influence grew throughout the 1930s, his wealth grew commensurately; in 1935 he received a base salary of 8,400 Reichsmarks and an allowance of 12,000 Reichsmarks and by 1938 his income increased to 17,371 Reichsmarks, annually. Heydrich later received a Totenkopfring from Himmler for his SS service.

On 1 August 1931, Heydrich began his job as chief of the new 'Ic Service' (intelligence service). He set up office at the Brown House, the Nazi Party headquarters in Munich. By October he had created a network of spies and informers for intelligence-gathering purposes and to obtain information to be used as blackmail to further political aims. Information on thousands of people was recorded on index cards and stored at the Brown House. To mark the occasion of Heydrich's December wedding, Himmler promoted him to the rank of SS-Sturmbannführer (major).

In 1932, rumours were spread by Heydrich's enemies of his alleged Jewish ancestry. Wilhelm Canaris said he had obtained copies of documents proving Heydrich's Jewish ancestry, but these copies never surfaced. Nazi Gauleiter Rudolf Jordan claimed Heydrich was not a pure Aryan. Within the Nazi organisation such innuendo could be damning, even for the head of the Reich's counterintelligence service. Gregor Strasser passed the allegations on to the Nazi Party's racial expert, Achim Gercke, who investigated Heydrich's genealogy. Gercke reported that Heydrich was "... of German origin and free from any coloured and Jewish blood". He insisted that the rumours were baseless. Even so, Heydrich privately engaged SD member Ernst Hoffmann to further investigate and dispel the rumours.

Gestapo and SD
In mid-1932, Himmler appointed Heydrich chief of the renamed security service—the Sicherheitsdienst (SD). Heydrich's counterintelligence service grew into an effective machine of terror and intimidation. With Hitler striving for absolute power in Germany, Himmler and Heydrich wished to control the political police forces of all 17 German states. They began with Bavaria. In 1933, Heydrich gathered some of his men from the SD and together they stormed police headquarters in Munich and took over the organisation using intimidation tactics. Himmler became the Munich police chief and Heydrich became the commander of Department IV, the political police.

In 1933, Hitler became Chancellor of Germany, and through a series of decrees became Germany's Führer und Reichskanzler (leader and chancellor). The first concentration camps, which were originally intended to house political opponents, were established in early 1933. By year's end there were over fifty camps.

Hermann Göring founded the Gestapo in 1933 as a Prussian police force. When Göring transferred full authority over the Gestapo to Himmler in April 1934, it immediately became an instrument of terror under the SS's purview. Himmler named Heydrich to head the Gestapo on 22 April 1934. On 9 June 1934, Rudolf Hess declared the SD the official Nazi intelligence service.

Crushing the SA
Beginning in April 1934, and at Hitler's request, Heydrich and Himmler began building a dossier on Sturmabteilung (SA) leader Ernst Röhm in an effort to remove him as a rival for party leadership. At this point, the SS was still part of the SA, the early Nazi paramilitary organisation which now numbered over 3 million men. At Hitler's direction, Heydrich, Himmler, Göring, and Viktor Lutze drew up lists of those who should be killed, starting with seven top SA officials and including many more. On 30 June 1934 the SS and Gestapo acted in coordinated mass arrests that continued for two days. Röhm was shot without trial, along with the leadership of the SA. The purge became known as the Night of the Long Knives. Up to 200 people were killed in the action. Lutze was appointed SA's new head and it was converted into a sports and training organisation.

With the SA out of the way, Heydrich began building the Gestapo into an instrument of fear. He improved his index-card system, creating categories of offenders with colour-coded cards. The Gestapo had the authority to arrest citizens on the suspicion that they might commit a crime, and the definition of a crime was at their discretion. The Gestapo Law, passed in 1936, gave police the right to act extra-legally. This led to the sweeping use of Schutzhaft—"protective custody", a euphemism for the power to imprison people without judicial proceedings. The courts were not allowed to investigate or interfere. The Gestapo was considered to be acting legally as long as it was carrying out the leadership's will. People were arrested arbitrarily, sent to concentration camps, or killed.

Himmler began developing the notion of a Germanic religion and wanted SS members to leave the church. In early 1936, Heydrich left the Catholic Church in favour of the Gottgläubig movement. His wife, Lina, had already done so the year before. Heydrich not only felt he could no longer be a member, but came to consider the church's political power and influence a danger to the state.

Consolidating the police forces
On 17 June 1936, all police forces throughout Germany were united, following Hitler's appointment of Himmler as Chief of German Police. With this appointment by Hitler, Himmler and his deputy, Heydrich, became two of the most powerful men in the internal administration of Germany. Himmler immediately reorganised the police into two groups: the Ordnungspolizei (Order Police; Orpo), consisting of both the national uniformed police and the municipal police, and the Sicherheitspolizei (Security Police; SiPo), consisting of the Geheime Staatspolizei (Secret State Police; Gestapo) and Kriminalpolizei (Criminal Police; Kripo). At that point, Heydrich was head of the SiPo and SD. Heinrich Müller was the Gestapo's operations chief.

Heydrich was assigned to help organise the 1936 Summer Olympics in Berlin. The games were used to promote the propaganda aims of the Nazi regime. Goodwill ambassadors were sent to countries that were considering a boycott. Anti-Jewish violence was forbidden for the duration, and news stands were required to stop displaying copies of Der Stürmer. For his part in the games' success, Heydrich was awarded the Deutsches Olympiaehrenzeichen or German Olympic Games Decoration (First Class).

In January 1937, Heydrich directed the SD to secretly begin collecting and analysing public opinion and report back its findings. He then had the Gestapo carry out house searches, arrests, and interrogations, thus in effect exercising control over public opinion. In February 1938 when the Austrian Chancellor Kurt Schuschnigg resisted Hitler's proposed merger with Germany, Heydrich intensified the pressure on Austria by organising Nazi demonstrations and distributing propaganda in Vienna emphasising the common Germanic blood of the two countries. In the Anschluss on 12 March, Hitler declared the unification of Austria with Nazi Germany.

In mid-1939, Heydrich created the Stiftung Nordhav Foundation to obtain real estate for the SS and Security Police to use as guest houses and vacation spots. The Wannsee Villa, which the Stiftung Nordhav acquired in November 1940, was the site of the Wannsee Conference (20 January 1942). Heydrich was the lead speaker, with support from Adolf Eichmann. At Wannsee, senior Nazi officials formalised plans to deport and exterminate all Jews in German-occupied territory and those countries not yet conquered. This action was to be coordinated among the representatives from the Nazi state agencies present at the meeting.

On 27 September 1939, the SD and SiPo – made up of the Gestapo and the Criminal Police, or Kripo – were folded into the new Reich Security Main Office or Reichssicherheitshauptamt (RSHA), which was placed under Heydrich's control. The title of Chef der Sicherheitspolizei und des SD (Chief of Security Police and SD) or CSSD was conferred on Heydrich on 1 October. Heydrich became the president of the International Criminal Police Commission (later known as Interpol) on 24 August 1940, and its headquarters were transferred to Berlin. He was promoted to SS-Obergruppenführer und General der Polizei on 24 September 1941.

Red Army purges
In 1936, Heydrich learned that a top-ranking Soviet officer was plotting to overthrow Joseph Stalin. Sensing an opportunity to strike a blow at both the Soviet Army and Admiral Canaris of Germany's Abwehr, Heydrich decided that the Soviet officer should be "unmasked". He discussed the matter with Himmler and both in turn brought it to Hitler's attention. Hitler approved Heydrich's plan to act immediately. But the "information" Heydrich had received was actually misinformation planted by Stalin himself in an attempt to legitimise his planned purges of the Red Army's high command. Stalin ordered one of his best NKVD agents, General Nikolai Skoblin, to pass Heydrich false information suggesting that Marshal Mikhail Tukhachevsky and other Soviet generals were plotting against Stalin.

Heydrich's SD forged documents and letters implicating Tukhachevsky and other Red Army commanders. The material was delivered to the NKVD. The Great Purge of the Red Army followed on Stalin's orders. While Heydrich believed they had deluded Stalin into executing or dismissing 35,000 of his officer corps, the importance of Heydrich's part is a matter of conjecture. Soviet military prosecutors did not use SD forged documents against the generals in their secret trial; they instead relied on false confessions extorted or beaten out of the defendants.

Night-and-Fog decree

By late 1940, German armies had invaded most of Western Europe. The following year, Heydrich's SD was given responsibility for carrying out the Nacht und Nebel (Night-and-Fog) decree. According to the decree, "persons endangering German security" were to be arrested in a maximally discreet way: "under the cover of night and fog". People disappeared without a trace with no one told of their whereabouts or fate. For each prisoner, the SD had to fill in a questionnaire that listed personal information, country of origin, and the details of their crimes against the Reich. This questionnaire was placed in an envelope inscribed with a seal reading "Nacht und Nebel" and submitted to the Reich Security Main Office (RSHA). In the WVHA "Central Inmate File", as in many camp files, these prisoners would be given a special "covert prisoner" code, as opposed to the code for POW, Felon, Jew, Gypsy, etc. The decree remained in effect after Heydrich's death. The exact number of people who vanished under it has never been positively established, but it is estimated to be 7,000.

Anti-Polish policies
Heydrich created the "Zentralstelle IIP Polen" unit of the Gestapo in order to co-ordinate the ethnic cleansing of Poles in "Operation Tannenberg" and the Intelligenzaktion, two codenames for extermination actions directed at the Polish people during the German occupation of Poland. Among the 100,000 people murdered in the Intelligenzaktion operations in 1939–1940, approximately 61,000 were members of the Polish intelligentsia: scholars, clergy, former officers, and others, whom the Germans identified as political targets in the Special Prosecution Book-Poland, compiled before the war began in September 1939.

Acting Reich Protector of Bohemia and Moravia

On 27 September 1941, Heydrich was appointed Deputy Reich Protector of the Protectorate of Bohemia and Moravia (the part of Czechoslovakia incorporated into the Reich on 15 March 1939) and assumed control of the territory. The Reich Protector, Konstantin von Neurath, remained the territory's titular head, but was sent on "leave" because Hitler, Himmler, and Heydrich felt his "soft approach" to the Czechs had promoted anti-German sentiment and encouraged anti-German resistance via strikes and sabotage. Upon his appointment, Heydrich told his aides: "We will Germanize the Czech vermin."

Heydrich came to Prague to enforce policy, fight resistance to the Nazi regime, and keep up production quotas of Czech motors and arms that were "extremely important to the German war effort". He viewed the area as a bulwark of Germandom and condemned the Czech resistance's "stabs in the back". To realise his goals, Heydrich demanded racial classification of those who could and could not be Germanized. He explained, "Making this Czech garbage into Germans must give way to methods based on racist thought."

Heydrich started his rule by terrorising the population: he proclaimed martial law, and 142 people were executed within five days of his arrival in Prague. Their names appeared on posters throughout the occupied country. Most of them were the members of the resistance that had previously been captured and were awaiting trial.

According to Heydrich's estimate, between 4,000 and 5,000 people were arrested and between 400 and 500 were executed by February 1942. Those who were not executed were sent to Mauthausen-Gusen concentration camp, where only four per cent of Czech prisoners survived the war. Czech prime minister Alois Eliáš was among those arrested the first day. He was put on trial in Berlin and sentenced to death, but was kept alive as a hostage. He was later executed in retaliation for Heydrich's assassination.

In March 1942, further sweeps against Czech cultural and patriotic organisations, the military, and the intelligentsia resulted in the practical paralysis of the London-based Czech resistance. Almost all avenues by which Czechs could express the Czech culture in public were closed. Although small disorganised cells of Central Leadership of Home Resistance (Ústřední vedení odboje domácího, ÚVOD) survived, only the communist resistance was able to function in a coordinated manner (although it also suffered arrests). The terror also served to paralyse resistance in society, with public and widespread reprisals by the Nazis against any action resisting German rule. Heydrich's brutal policies during that time quickly earned him the nickname "the Butcher of Prague". The reprisals are referred to by Czechs as the Heydrichiáda.

As Acting Reich Protector of Bohemia and Moravia, Heydrich applied carrot-and-stick methods. Labor was reorganised on the basis of the German Labour Front. Heydrich used equipment confiscated from the Czech gymnastics organisation Sokol to organise events for workers. Food rations and free shoes were distributed, pensions were increased, and (for a time) free Saturdays were introduced. Unemployment insurance was established for the first time. The black market was suppressed. Those associated with it or the resistance movement were tortured or executed. Heydrich labelled them "economic criminals" and "enemies of the people", which helped gain him support. Conditions in Prague and the rest of the Czech lands were relatively peaceful under Heydrich, and industrial output increased. Still, those measures could not hide shortages and increasing inflation; reports of growing discontent multiplied.

Despite public displays of goodwill towards the populace, privately Heydrich was very clear about his eventual goal: "This entire area will one day be definitely German, and the Czechs have nothing to expect here." Eventually up to two-thirds of the populace were to be either removed to regions of Russia or exterminated after Nazi Germany won the war. Bohemia and Moravia faced annexation directly into the German Reich.

The Czech workforce was exploited as Nazi-conscripted labour. More than 100,000 workers were removed from "unsuitable" jobs and conscripted by the Ministry of Labour. By December 1941, Czechs could be called to work anywhere within the Reich. Between April and November 1942, 79,000 Czech workers were taken in this manner for work within Nazi Germany. Also, in February 1942, the work day was increased from eight to twelve hours.

Heydrich was, for all intents and purposes, military dictator of Bohemia and Moravia. His changes to the government's structure left President Emil Hácha and his cabinet virtually powerless. He often drove alone in a car with an open roofa show of his confidence in the occupation forces and in his government's effectiveness.

By 3 October 1941, Czechoslovak military intelligence in London had made the decision to kill Heydrich.

Role in the Holocaust

Historians regard Heydrich as the most fearsome member of the Nazi elite. Hitler called him "the man with the iron heart". He was one of the main architects of the Holocaust during the early war years, answering to and taking orders from only Hitler, Göring, and Himmler in all matters pertaining to the deportation, imprisonment, and extermination of Jews.

Heydrich was one of the organisers of Kristallnacht, a pogrom against Jews throughout Germany on the night of 9–10 November 1938. Heydrich sent a telegram that night to various SD and Gestapo offices, helping to coordinate the pogrom with the SS, SD, Gestapo, uniformed police (Orpo), SA, Nazi party officials, and even the fire departments. In the telegram, Heydrich granted permission for arson and destruction of Jewish businesses and synagogues, and ordered the confiscation of all "archival material" from Jewish community centres and synagogues. The telegram ordered that "as many Jewsparticularly affluent Jewsare to be arrested in all districts as can be accommodated in existing detention facilities ... Immediately after the arrests have been carried out, the appropriate concentration camps should be contacted to place the Jews into camps as quickly as possible." Twenty thousand Jews were sent to concentration camps in the days immediately following; historians consider Kristallnacht the beginning of the Holocaust.

When Hitler asked for a pretext for the invasion of Poland in 1939, Himmler, Heydrich, and Heinrich Müller masterminded a false flag plan code-named Operation Himmler. It involved a fake attack on the German radio station at Gleiwitz on 31 August 1939. Wearing Polish uniforms, 150 German troops carried out several attacks along the border. Hitler used the ruse as an excuse to launch his invasion.

On Himmler's instructions, Heydrich formed the Einsatzgruppen (task forces) to travel in the wake of the German armies at the start of World War II. On 21 September 1939, Heydrich sent out a teleprinter message on the "Jewish question in the occupied territory" to the chiefs of all Einsatzgruppen with instructions to round up Jewish people for placement into ghettos, called for the formation of Judenräte (Jewish councils), ordered a census, and promoted Aryanization plans for Jewish-owned businesses and farms, among other measures. The Einsatzgruppen units followed the army into Poland to implement the plans. Later, in the Soviet Union, they were charged with rounding up and murdering Jews via firing squad and gas vans. Historian Raul Hilberg estimates that between 1941 and 1945 the Einsatzgruppen and related auxiliary troops murdered more than two million people, including 1.3 million Jews. Heydrich ensured the safety of certain athletes, such as Paul Sommer, a Jewish German champion fencer he knew from his pre-SS days, and the Polish Olympic fencing team that competed at the 1936 Summer Olympics.

On 29 November 1939, Heydrich issued a cable about the "Evacuation of New Eastern Provinces", detailing the deportation of people by railway to concentration camps, and giving guidance surrounding the December 1939 census, which would be the basis on which those deportations were performed. In May 1941 Heydrich drew up regulations with Quartermaster general Eduard Wagner for the upcoming invasion of the Soviet Union, which ensured that the Einsatzgruppen and army would co-operate in murdering Soviet Jews.

On 10 October 1941, Heydrich was the senior officer at a "Final Solution" meeting of the RSHA in Prague that discussed deporting 50,000 Jews from the Protectorate of Bohemia and Moravia to ghettos in Minsk and Riga. Given his position, Heydrich was instrumental in carrying out these plans since his Gestapo was ready to organise deportations in the West and his Einsatzgruppen were already conducting extensive killing operations in the East. The officers attending also discussed taking 5,000 Jews from Prague "in the next few weeks" and handing them over to the Einsatzgruppen commanders Arthur Nebe and Otto Rasch. Establishing ghettos in the Protectorate was also planned, resulting in the construction of the Theresienstadt Ghetto, where 33,000 people would eventually die. Tens of thousands more passed through the camp before being sent East to be murdered. In 1941 Himmler named Heydrich as "responsible for implementing" the forced movement of 60,000 Jews from Germany and Czechoslovakia to the Łódź (Litzmannstadt) Ghetto in Poland.

Earlier on 31 July 1941, Hermann Göring gave written authorisation to Heydrich to ensure the co-operation of administrative leaders of various government departments in the implementation of a "Final Solution to the Jewish question" in territories under German control.  On 20 January 1942, Heydrich chaired a meeting, now called the Wannsee Conference, to discuss the implementation of the plan.

Death

In London, the Czechoslovak government-in-exile resolved to kill Heydrich. Jan Kubiš and Jozef Gabčík headed the team chosen for the mission, trained by the British Special Operations Executive (SOE). On 28 December 1941 they parachuted into the Protectorate, where they lived in hiding, preparing for the mission.

On 27 May 1942, Heydrich planned to meet Hitler in Berlin. German documents suggest that Hitler intended to transfer him to German-occupied France where the French resistance was gaining ground. To get from his home to the airport, Heydrich would have to pass a section where the Dresden-Prague road merges with a road to the Troja Bridge. The junction in the Prague suburb of Libeň was well suited for the attack because motorists have to slow for a hairpin bend. As Heydrich's car slowed, Gabčík took aim with a Sten submachine gun, but it jammed and failed to fire. Heydrich ordered his driver, Klein, to halt and attempted to confront Gabčík rather than speed away. Kubiš, who had not been spotted by Heydrich or Klein, threw a converted anti-tank mine at the car as it stopped, which landed against the rear wheel. The explosion ripped through the right rear fender and wounded Heydrich, with metal fragments and fibres from the upholstery causing serious damage to his left side. He suffered major injuries to his diaphragm, spleen, and one lung, as well as a broken rib. Kubiš received a minor shrapnel wound to his face. After Kubiš fled, Heydrich ordered Klein to chase Gabčík on foot, and Gabčík shot Klein in the leg before escaping.

A Czech woman went to Heydrich's aid and flagged down a delivery van. He was placed on his stomach in the back of the van and taken to the emergency room at Bulovka Hospital. A splenectomy was performed, and the chest wound, left lung, and diaphragm were all debrided. Himmler ordered Karl Gebhardt to fly to Prague to assume care. Despite a fever, Heydrich's recovery appeared to progress well. Hitler's personal doctor Theodor Morell suggested the use of the new antibacterial drug sulfonamide, but Gebhardt thought that Heydrich would recover and declined the suggestion. Heydrich reconciled himself to his fate on 2 June, during a visit by Himmler, by reciting one of his father's operas:

On 3 June, the day after Himmler's visit, Heydrich fell into a coma and never regained consciousness. He died on 4 June; an autopsy concluded that he died of sepsis. He was 38 years old.

Funeral

After an elaborate funeral held in Prague on 7 June 1942, Heydrich's coffin was placed on a train to Berlin, where a second ceremony was held in the new Reich Chancellery on 9 June. Himmler gave the eulogy. Hitler attended and placed Heydrich's decorations—including the highest grade of the German Order, the Blood Order Medal, the Wound Badge in Gold, and the War Merit Cross 1st Class with Swords—on his funeral pillow. Although Heydrich's death was employed for pro-Reich propaganda, Hitler privately blamed Heydrich for his own death, through carelessness:

Heydrich was interred in Berlin's Invalidenfriedhof, a military cemetery. The exact burial spot is no longer public knowledge—a temporary wooden marker that disappeared when the Red Army overran the city in 1945 was never replaced, so that Heydrich's grave could not become a rallying point for Neo-Nazis. Nevertheless, on 16 December 2019, the BBC reported that Heydrich's unmarked grave had been opened by unknown persons, without anything being taken. A photograph of Heydrich's burial shows the wreaths and mourners to be in section A, which abuts the north wall of the Invalidenfriedhof and Scharnhorststraße, at the front of the cemetery. A recent biography of Heydrich also places the grave in Section A. Hitler planned for Heydrich to have a monumental tomb (designed by sculptor Arno Breker and architect Wilhelm Kreis) but, due to Germany's declining fortunes, it was never built.

Heydrich's widow Lina won the right to a pension following a series of court cases against the West German government in 1956 and 1959. She was declared entitled to a substantial pension as her husband was a German general killed in action. The government had previously declined to pay due to Heydrich's role in the Holocaust. The couple had four children: Klaus, born in 1933, killed in a traffic accident in 1943; Heider, born in 1934; Silke, born in 1939; and Marte, born shortly after her father's death in 1942. Lina wrote a memoir, Leben mit einem Kriegsverbrecher (Living With a War Criminal), which was published in 1976. She remarried once and died in 1985.

Aftermath

Heydrich's assailants hid in safe houses and eventually took refuge in Saints Cyril and Methodius Cathedral, an Orthodox church in Prague. After a traitor in the Czech resistance betrayed their location, the church was surrounded by 800 members of the SS and Gestapo. Several Czechs were killed, and the remainder hid in the church's crypt. The Germans attempted to flush the men out with gunfire and tear gas, and by flooding the crypt. Eventually an entrance was made using explosives. Rather than surrender, the soldiers killed themselves. Supporters of the assassins who were killed in the wake of these events included the church's leader, Bishop Gorazd, who is now revered as a martyr of the Orthodox Church.

Infuriated by Heydrich's death, Hitler ordered the arrest and execution of 10,000 randomly selected Czechs. But after consultations with Karl Hermann Frank, he altered his response. The Czech lands were an important industrial zone for the German military, and indiscriminate killing could reduce the region's productivity. Hitler ordered a quick investigation. Intelligence falsely linked the assassins to the towns of Lidice and Ležáky. On 9 June, after discussions with Himmler and Karl Hermann Frank, Hitler ordered brutal reprisals. On 9 June, in the village of Lidice 172 boys and men between age 14 to 84 were shot. Thereafter, all adults in Ležáky were murdered.

All but four of the women from Lidice were deported immediately to Ravensbrück concentration camp (four were pregnantthey were subjected to forced abortions at the same hospital where Heydrich had died and the women were then sent to the concentration camp). Some children were chosen for Germanization, and 81 were murdered in gas vans at the Chełmno extermination camp. Both towns were burned and Lidice's ruins were levelled. Overall, at least 1,300 Czechs, including 200 women, were killed in reprisal for Heydrich's assassination.

Heydrich's replacements were Ernst Kaltenbrunner as the chief of RSHA, and Karl Hermann Frank (27–28 May 1942) and Kurt Daluege (28 May 194214 October 1943) as the new acting Reichsprotektors. After Heydrich's death, implementation of the policies formalised at the Wannsee conference he chaired was accelerated. The first three true death camps, designed for mass murder with no legal process or pretext, were built and operated at Treblinka, Sobibór, and Bełżec. The project was named Operation Reinhard after Heydrich.

Service record
Heydrich's time in the SS was a mixture of rapid promotions, reserve commissions in the regular armed forces, and front-line combat service. During his 11 years with the SS Heydrich "rose from the ranks" and was appointed to every rank from private to full general. He was also a major in the Luftwaffe, flying nearly 100 combat missions until 22 July 1941, when his plane was hit by Soviet anti-aircraft fire. Heydrich made an emergency landing behind enemy lines. He evaded a Soviet patrol and contacted a forward German patrol. After this Hitler personally ordered Heydrich to return to Berlin to resume his SS duties. His service record also gives him credit as a Navy Reserve Lieutenant, but in 1931 he was dismissed for conduct unbecoming an officer with loss of rank, and during World War II he had no contact with the Navy Reserve.

Heydrich began training as a pilot in 1935, and undertook fighter pilot training at the flight school at Werneuchen in 1939. Himmler initially forbade Heydrich from flying combat missions, but later relented, allowing him to join Jagdgeschwader 77 in Norway, where he was stationed from 15 April 1940 during Operation Weserübung. He returned to Berlin on 14 May after having crashed his plane on takeoff at Stavanger the previous day. While in Norway, Heydrich also organized the arrests of political opponents and arranged for a contingent of 200 SiPo and SD men to be stationed in several major cities.

On 20 July 1941, without seeking authorization from Himmler, Heydrich rejoined Jagdgeschwader 77 during Operation Barbarossa, arriving at Yampil, Vinnytsia Oblast in a borrowed Me 109. His aircraft was hit by Russian flak in action near the Dniester on 22 July, and he had to land the plane in enemy territory. He avoided capture and returned to Berlin after being rescued by a patrol. It was his final combat mission.

Heydrich received a number of Nazi and military awards. These included the German Order, Blood Order, Golden Party Badge, Luftwaffe Pilot's Badge, bronze and silver Front Flying Clasp of the Luftwaffe for combat missions, and the Iron Cross First and Second Classes.

See also

Dramatic portrayals of Reinhard Heydrich
Glossary of Nazi Germany
List of Nazi Party leaders and officials
List of rulers of the Protectorate of Bohemia and Moravia
List of SS-Obergruppenführer

Informational notes

Citations

Bibliography

Further reading

External links

Documents concerning the Wannsee Conference, Wannsee House Museum
Reinhard Heydrich on the Yad Vashem website

, unissued British Pathé newsreel (muted)

 
1904 births
1942 deaths
Burials at the Invalids' Cemetery
Deaths by explosive device
Deaths from sepsis
Einsatzgruppen
Former Roman Catholics
German World War II pilots
Gestapo personnel
Reinhard
Holocaust perpetrators
Holocaust perpetrators in Bohemia and Moravia
Infectious disease deaths in Czechoslovakia
Interpol officials
Luftwaffe pilots
Members of the Reichstag of Nazi Germany
Nazi leaders assassinated by the Allies
Nazi Party officials
Night and Fog program
Operation Anthropoid
Military personnel from Halle (Saale)
People from the Province of Saxony
Planning the Holocaust
Romani genocide perpetrators
Protectorate of Bohemia and Moravia
Recipients of the German Order (decoration)
Recipients of the Iron Cross (1939), 1st class
Recipients of the War Merit Cross
Reich Security Main Office personnel
SS-Obergruppenführer
20th-century Freikorps personnel
Anti-Czech sentiment
German military personnel killed in World War II
Politicide perpetrators
Military personnel from Saxony-Anhalt